George Leonchuk (tr. Heorhiy Ihorovych Leonchuk; born 24 May 1974 in Potsdam, German Democratic Republic) is a Ukrainian sailor.

Career highlights

World Championships
2001 - Malcesine,  3rd, 49er (with Rodion Luka)
2002 - Hawaii, 5th, 49er (with Rodion Luka)
2003 - Cadiz,  3rd, 49er (with Rodion Luka)
2005 - Moscow,  1st, 49er (with Rodion Luka)
2006 - Aix-les-Bains, 9th, 49er (with Rodion Luka)
2007 - Cascais, 14th, 49er (with Rodion Luka)
2008 - Sorrento,  3rd, 49er (with Rodion Luka)
Summer Olympics
2000 - Sydney, 10th, 49er (with Rodion Luka)
2004 - Athens,  2nd, 49er (with Rodion Luka)
European Championships
2000 - Medemblik,  3rd, 49er (with Rodion Luka)
2001 - Brest, 4th, 49er (with Rodion Luka)

2007 - Marsala, 13th, 49er (with Rodion Luka)

Other achievements
2000 - Kiel, Kieler Woche,  2nd, 49er
2001 - Medemblik, SPA Regatta,  1st, 49er
2001 - Kiel, Kieler Woche,  2nd, 49er
2002 - Medemblik, SPA Regatta,  2nd, 49er
2003 - Hyères, Semaine Olympique Française,  1st, 49er
2003 - Medemblik, SPA Regatta,  3rd, 49er
2005 - Miami, Rolex Miami OCR,  2nd, 49er
2006 - Miami, Rolex Miami OCR,  3rd, 49er
2006 - Miami, North American Championships,  3rd, 49er
2010 - San Remo, Italian Championship,  1st, Dragon
2010 - Marstrand, Swedish Championship,  1st, Dragon
2010 - Marstrand, BMW Dragon Gold Cup,  2nd, Dragon

External links 
 
 
 
 49er World Championships
 OUTTERIDGE And AUSTIN Win 49er World Title

1974 births
Living people
Ukrainian male sailors (sport)
Sailors at the 2000 Summer Olympics – 49er
Sailors at the 2004 Summer Olympics – 49er
Sailors at the 2008 Summer Olympics – 49er
Olympic sailors of Ukraine
Olympic silver medalists for Ukraine
Olympic medalists in sailing
Medalists at the 2004 Summer Olympics
Sportspeople from Potsdam
49er class world champions
World champions in sailing for Ukraine
21st-century Ukrainian people